Charles Dick may refer to:
 Charles W. F. Dick, American politician from Ohio
 Charles Dick (rugby union), Scottish rugby union player
 Charles Dick (cricketer), South African cricketer
 Charlie Dick, American Linotype operator, widower of Patsy Cline

See also
 Dick Charles, American songwriter